Jicun may refer to the following locations in China:

 Jicun, Hebei (姬村镇), town in Yuanshi County
 Jicun, Jiangxi (吉村镇), town in Dayu County
 Jicun, Shanxi (冀村镇), town in Fenyang